The De Zeven Provinciën class (also called Eendracht class) was a class of light cruisers. They were built by Rotterdamsche Droogdok Maatschappij (RDM) and Wilton-Fijenoord for the Royal Netherlands Navy. The name De Zeven Provinciën refers to the seven provinces which formed the Dutch Republic in 1581.

Design 
In the 1930s there was an increased awareness in the Netherlands about the threat which the Imperial Japanese Navy posed to the Dutch East Indies. To face this, the Koninklijke Marine embarked on a major naval expansion program in 1932, which included building two new light cruisers as replacements for the aging s. The design was an improvement of the earlier  and both ships were laid down in 1939. The first was named Kijkduin, later changed to Eendracht, and the second one received the name De Zeven Provinciën, hence the name of the class. The main armament was designed as two triple and two twin Bofors 152 mm/53 caliber guns.

However, construction was interrupted by the German invasion of the Netherlands on 10 May 1940. De Zeven Provinciën was 25% completed and Kijkduin 12%. The Germans redesigned the ships main armament. De Zeven Provinciën was planned with four dual turrets 15 cm SK C/28 guns. Eendracht was planned with smaller guns taken from a broken down battleship, but the exact gun types are unknown. The Germans continued work on De Zeven Provinciën which was more advanced than its twin; it was renamed KH1 ("KH" means "Kreuzer Holland") and modified by fitting an Atlantik Bow. Eendracht was renamed KH2. Work progressed very slowly as the dockyards' capacity was used for other purposes and sabotage by the Dutch resistance affected progress. On 24 December 1944, KH1 was launched for use as a blockship in the Nieuwe Waterweg of Rotterdam but this action was never carried out.

After the end of World War II, construction resumed on both ships to a modified design which incorporated the lessons of the war. Armament was modified from two triple and two twin Bofors 152 mm/53 guns, six twin 40 mm AA and two triple 533 mm torpedo tubes to four twin Bofors 152 mm/53 guns, four twin Bofors 57 mm/60 guns and eight single Bofors 40 mm/70 guns. An improved propulsion plant was fitted as well as a second funnel and advanced electronics. Names were also changed with Eendracht becoming De Zeven Provinciën and the former De Zeven Provinciën being renamed De Ruyter. Both ships were finally commissioned by the Royal Netherlands Navy in 1953.

Ships in class 
There were two ships in the class:  (renamed De Ruyter in 1947) and  Kijkduin (renamed Eendracht c. 1940, De Ruyter in 1944 and De Zeven Provinciën in 1947). Both ships enjoyed long service lives, first in the Koninklijke Marine (until the early 1970s) and then in the Marina de Guerra del Perú.

Royal Netherlands Navy 

In Dutch service both ships participated in several NATO exercises, and were frequently used as flagships for different naval task forces. Between 1962 and 1964, De Zeven Provinciën underwent a refit by RDM which included the removal of the two aft turrets and the installation of a RIM-2 Terrier SAM system. Lack of funds precluded the same modifications from being carried out in De Ruyter, which was decommissioned in 1972. Her sister ship followed suit in 1975; the cruisers were replaced in Dutch service by the two s.

Peruvian Navy 
De Ruyter was acquired by the Peruvian Navy and recommissioned in 1973 as fleet flagship . From 1985 until 1988 Almirante Grau underwent a major modernization by Amsterdam Naval Services (ANS), which allowed the ship to remain in service, whereas Aguirre was decommissioned in 1999. Almirante Grau was decommissioned in 2017, and will be preserved as a museum ship.

As of February 2022, the Peruvian Government has decided to open tender for the sale of the ship.

References

Sources
 Moore, John (ed.), Jane's Fighting Ships 1974–75. Franklin Watts Inc., 1975.
  Rodríguez Asti, John, Cruceros. Buques de la Marina de Guerra del Perú desde 1884. Dirección de Intereses Marítimos, 2000.
 netherlandsnavy.nl

Further reading 
 Friedman, Norman "Anti-Aircraft Cruisers: The Life of a Class" United States Naval Institute Proceedings January 1965

Cruiser classes